Rodrigo Soria (born 14 February 1987 in Villa Domínico, Argentina) is a professional footballer who plays as a winger and second striker. He currently plays for Olmedo, on loan from Cúcuta Deportivo. Before that, he was on Sportivo Carapeguá of Paraguay.

Teams
  Quilmes 2006–2009
  Defensa y Justicia 2009
  Gimnasia y Esgrima de Mendoza 2010
  Sportivo Luqueño 2011–2012
  Sportivo Carapegua 2012
  Cúcuta Deportivo 2013–2014
  Talleres Córdoba 2014
  Villa San Carlos 2014–
  → Olmedo (loan) 2015–

References

External links
 Profile at BDFA
 
 

1987 births
Living people
Argentine footballers
Argentine expatriate footballers
Quilmes Atlético Club footballers
Defensa y Justicia footballers
Gimnasia y Esgrima de Mendoza footballers
Sportivo Luqueño players
Expatriate footballers in Paraguay
Association football forwards
People from Avellaneda Partido
Sportspeople from Buenos Aires Province